George Frederick Harris (13 September 1862 – 16 July 1906) was an English palaeontologist. He was one of the founders of the Malacological Society of London and a Fellow of the Geological Society.

Education
Harris was educated at Netherhampton House School, Wilton, near Salisbury. He subsequently attended classes at King's College, London, and the Birkbeck Institution.

Works

Catalogue of Tertiary Mollusca in the Department of Geology, British Museum (Natural History). Part 1. The Australasian Tertiary Mollusca. British Museum (Natural History). Department of Geology.
 The Gelinden Beds, Geological Magazine, 1887
 Granites and our Granite Industries, 1888
 The Geology of Gironde, Geological Magazine, 1890
With Henry William Burrows: The Eocene and Oligocene beds of the Paris basin, 1891
 A Journey through Russia, Geological Magazine, 1898

References

Gallery
Plates from the Catalogue of Tertiary Mollusca:

19th-century British geologists
1906 deaths
1862 births